Occupation of Liberec occurred on 21 August 1968 during the Warsaw Pact invasion of Czechoslovakia. In the early hours of the Soviet invasion, 4 people were shot dead by Soviet troops in the main square and 24 were injured, 2 of whom died later; a few hours after this, a Soviet tank rammed the arcade at the square causing the immediate death of 2 people and injured 9 (1 died later); Occupation of Liberec was second bloodiest event of the invasion after Battle for Czechoslovak Radio.

Background
On January 5, 1968, Alexander Dubček became the first secretary of the Central Committee of the CPSU. It marked the beginning of the so-called Prague Spring. This process began to worry other Eastern Bloc countries, including the USSR. The leadership of the Soviet Union initially attempted to stop or limit the changes in the Czechoslovakia through a series of warnings. After a series of unsuccessful negotiations on the night of August 20 to August 21, 1968, the troops of the five Warsaw Pact states launched an invasion of Czechoslovakia.

Events
Soviet troops reached Liberec at 2 am. At 3 am. first incident happened when groop of Soldiers started shooting at youths who believed it is a military training. Miroslav Vlček was shot in head but survived. 

When the sun came out crowds of people went to streets. They expressed their opposition toSoviet occupation by making gestures, threatening with their fists, crying and shouting at soldiers. Some started throwing stones and pieces of construction material at Soviet soldiers. At 6 am a Soviet tanks runs over Jan Šoltys on Beneš' square after Šoltys throws a piece of wood at the tank. Šoltys is badly injured but survives. At 7 am a brick is thrown at Soviet soldiers passing through Beneš's square in a GAZ vehicle and injures the driver. Soviet soldiers started shooting at people on the square. Shooting resulted in immediate death of 4 people and injury of tens. 2 other people die of their injuries a few day later. Around 11 am a Soviet tanker crashes near town's square and kills three other people.

References

Warsaw Pact invasion of Czechoslovakia
1968 in Czechoslovakia

Liberec